Rory Smith may refer to:

 Rory Smith (journalist), journalist of The New York Times
 Rory Smith (lacrosse player) (born 1987), Canadian professional lacrosse player